Garbis Zakaryan, (June 2, 1930 – 25 January 2020) was a Turkish and European welterweight boxing champion of Armenian ethnicity. He was the first Turkish professional boxer. He was nicknamed "Demir Yumruk" ("Iron Fist").

Life and career
Zakaryan was born in Istanbul, of Armenian descent, and studied at the local Armenian Esayan school. His father couldn't work because of poor health and his mother would make the entire household living from knitting. He left school at 5th grade and began working as a newspaper salesman. He began his boxing career in 1944 at the Boğaziçi Turnuvası (Bosporus Tournament). He became the Istanbul and Turkey champion at 48 kg in 1947 and 1948. He then represented the Turkish National Team for the first time in 1949 against Spain. He became the first Turkish professional boxer in 1951. Zakaryan retired in 1966. He then worked as a boxing trainer including European champion, Cemal Kamaci.

Zakaryan went on to lose his European champion title in March 1957. He was Middle-East champion in 1964.

Zakaryan died on 25 January 2020 at the age of 89 in Istanbul, Turkey. He was interred at Şişli Armenian Cemetery after the religious funeral ceremony at Surp Yerrortutyun Armenian Church.

Record

| style="text-align:center;" colspan="8"|28 Wins (6 knockouts), 8 Losses (1 knockouts), 5 Draws
|-  style="text-align:center; background:#e3e3e3;"
|  style="border-style:none none solid solid; "|Res.
|  style="border-style:none none solid solid; "|Record
|  style="border-style:none none solid solid; "|Opponent
|  style="border-style:none none solid solid; "|Type
|  style="border-style:none none solid solid; "|Date
|  style="border-style:none none solid solid; "|Location
|  style="border-style:none none solid solid; "|Notes
|- align=center
|style="background: #B0C4DE"|Draw||32-13-6||align=left| Franco Nenci
|||
|align=left|
|align=left|
|- align=center
|Win||1-1||align=left| Piero Morgia
|||
|align=left|
|align=left|
|- align=center
|Win||0-1||align=left| Maroun Jeres
|||
|align=left|
|align=left|
|- align=center
|Win||5-5-3||align=left| Abdulha Mohamed Djen Doubi
|||
|align=left|
|align=left|
|- align=center
|Win||4-6||align=left| Jean-Claude Labreuille
|||
|align=left|
|align=left|
|- align=center
|Win||2-1-2||align=left| Lothar Kremer
|||
|align=left|
|align=left|
|- align=center
|Win||2-1-2||align=left| Lothar Kremer
|||
|align=left|
|align=left|
|- align=center
|Win||0-0||align=left| Maroun Jeres
|||
|align=left|
|align=left|
|- align=center
|Win||3-17-6||align=left| Mario Della Corte
|||
|align=left|
|align=left|
|- align=center
|Win||39-29-11||align=left| Rene Brunet
|||
|align=left|
|align=left|
|- align=center
|Win||66-65-20||align=left| Jean Ruellet
|||
|align=left|
|align=left|
|- align=center
|Win||38-26-10||align=left| Rene Brunet
|||
|align=left|
|align=left|
|- align=center
|Win||1-0-2||align=left| Charles Attali
|||
|align=left|
|align=left|
|- align=center
|style="background: #B0C4DE"|Draw||1-0-1||align=left| Charles Attali
|||
|align=left|
|align=left|
|- align=center
|Win||0-1-0||align=left| Mohammed Salah Mousri
|||
|align=left|
|align=left|
|- align=center
|Loss||38-15-4||align=left| Paulo Sacoman
|||
|align=left|
|align=left|
|- align=center
|Win||11-7-6||align=left| Brahim Kettani
|||
|align=left|
|align=left|
|- align=center
|Loss||34-2-2||align=left| Martiniano Pereyra
|||
|align=left|
|- align=center
|Loss||44-1-2||align=left| Cirilo Gil
|||
|align=left|
|- align=center
|Loss||48-7-2||align=left| Idrissa Dione
|||
|align=left|
|align=left|
|- align=center
|Win||14-3-2||align=left| Ousmane Cisse
|||
|align=left|
|align=left|
|- align=center
|Loss||7-0-0||align=left| Jacques Nervi
|||
|align=left|
|align=left|
|- align=center
|Win||16-1-0||align=left| Michel François
|||
|align=left|
|align=left|
|- align=center
|Win||22-6-2||align=left| Ziyaris Taki
|||
|align=left|
|align=left|
|- align=center
|Win||22-6-2||align=left| Ahmed Belarbi II
|||
|align=left|
|align=left|
|- align=center
|style="background: #B0C4DE"|Draw||0-1-0||align=left| Jan Papadopulos
|||
|align=left|
|align=left|
|- align=center
|Win||19-7-8||align=left| Karl Oechsle
|||
|align=left|
|align=left|
|- align=center
|Win||||align=left| Emmanuel Lambidis
|||
|align=left|
|align=left|
|- align=center
|Win||||align=left| Jan Papadopulos
|||
|align=left|
|align=left|
|- align=center
|Loss||34-2-0||align=left| Idrissa Dione
|||
|align=left|
|align=left|
|- align=center
|Loss||33-2-0||align=left| Idrissa Dione
|||
|align=left|
|align=left|
|- align=center
|Win||||align=left| Brahim Kettani
|||
|align=left|
|align=left|
|- align=center
|Win||22-30-7||align=left| Emmanuel Clavel
|||
|align=left|
|align=left|
|- align=center
|Win||15-3-2||align=left| Ziyaris Taki
|||
|align=left|
|align=left|
|- align=center
|Win||9-22-4||align=left| Robert Astoine
|||
|align=left|
|align=left|
|- align=center
|style="background: #B0C4DE"|Draw||16-15-31||align=left| Freddi Teichmann
|||
|align=left|
|align=left|
|- align=center
|Win||22-8-4||align=left| Charles Dhery
|||
|align=left|
|align=left|
|- align=center
|Win||8-18-4||align=left| Leandre Mateos
|||
|align=left|
|align=left|
|- align=center
|Win||8-18-4||align=left| Michel Lambidis
|||
|align=left|
|align=left|
|- align=center
|Win||5-0-0||align=left| Ziyaris Taki
|||
|align=left|
|align=left|
|- align=center
|Loss||2-0-0||align=left| Ziyaris Taki
|||
|align=left|
|align=left|
|- align=center
|style="background: #B0C4DE"|Draw||5-6-2||align=left| Ali Amrane
|||
|align=left|
|align=left|

See also
 Armenians in Turkey

References

2020 deaths
1930 births
Sportspeople from Istanbul
Armenians in Istanbul
Welterweight boxers
Turkish male boxers
Armenian male boxers
Burials at Şişli Armenian Cemetery